Entry may refer to:
Entry, West Virginia, an unincorporated community in the United States
Entry (cards), a term used in trick-taking card-games
Entry (economics), a term in connection with markets
Entry (film), a 2013 Indian Malayalam film
Entry, occurrence of a repeated musical theme, especially in a fugue
 Atmospheric entry

See also
 Enter (disambiguation)
Entrance (disambiguation)